San Pedro de Huaca Canton is a canton of Ecuador, located in Carchi Province. Its capital is the town of Huaca. Its population in the 2001 census was 6,856 and in 2010 was 7,624.

The canton is located in the Andes.

The canton is divided into two parishes: Huaca (Waka) and Mariscal Sucre.

Demographics
Ethnic groups as of the Ecuadorian census of 2010:
Mestizo  93.4%
White  3.2%
Afro-Ecuadorian  1.8%
Indigenous  1.4%
Montubio 0.2%
Other  0.1%

References

Cantons of Carchi Province